Khalaj-e Olya (also Romanized as Khalaj-e ‘Olyā; also known as Khalaj-e Bālā) is a village in Hendudur Rural District, Sarband District, Shazand County, Markazi Province, Iran. At the 2006 census, its population was 54, in 14 families.

References 

Populated places in Shazand County